Sara Hussain, better known as Sara Loren, is a Pakistani actress and model mostly known for working in Hindi as well as Urdu movies and television. She is best known for played role as Barkhaa in 2015.

Early life
Loren was born and raised in Kuwait City, Kuwait. Her father migrated to Kuwait from Rajasthan following the Partition of India, and her mother is from Lahore, Punjab in Pakistan. During an interview in India she said she belongs to a multi-cultural background as her father is a Rajput from Rajasthan, and also said that she goes to the temple. As a teenager, she relocated with her family to Lahore following the death of her father.

Career
Loren made her film debut in the 2010 Pooja Bhatt's romantic thriller film Kajraare opposite Himesh Reshammiya and later played seductress Nisha in the 2013 film Murder 3. The following year she starred in Yasir Nawaz's Anjuman for which she won the Tarang Housefull Awards—Best Actress in a Leading Role. Loren made her acting debut in 2003 with the serial Rabia Zinda Rahegi. She has also appeared in Mahnoor, Meharun Nisa, Makan, Mehar Bano aur Shah Bano, Sandal, Riyasat, Help of a Ghost, Dupatta, Umrao jan-e-adaa, Madhosh  and was nominated for Best Drama Actress for her performance in  Main Mar Gai Shaukat Ali at 2nd Pakistan Media Awards.

Loren acted in the stage performances of Anarkali, Shahyad Issi Ka Naam Mohabbat Hai Sheiftaa, in Karachi and Delhi. Loren made her screen debut with the 2010 Pooja Bhatt's Bollywood film Kajraare. The following year, she had a cameo appearance in song "Love Mein Ghum" in Reema Khan's Love Mein Ghum. She then played the role of seductress Nisha in the 2013 film Murder 3. The following year, she made her Lollywood debut in Yasir Nawaz's Anjuman. In 2014, she did an item number "Saiyaan" in Syed Faisal Bukhari's Saltanat. She then appeared in Shadaab Mirza's Barkhaa, where she played a small town girl turned bar dancer. The film ran for 50 days but was commercially declared a disaster.

Filmography

Television

Web series

Film

Awards and nominations

References

External links
 
 
 
 

1987 births
Living people
People from Kuwait City
Pakistani film actresses
Pakistani television actresses
Pakistani female models
Actresses in Urdu cinema
Pakistani expatriates in Kuwait
Pakistani people of Rajasthani descent
Actresses in Hindi cinema
Converts to Christianity from Islam
Pakistani expatriate actresses in India
21st-century Pakistani actresses